Enid Luff (21 February 1935 – 19 February 2022) was a Welsh musician, music educator, and composer.

Biography
Luff was born in Ebbw Vale, Wales, and trained as a pianist. She was educated at the University of Wales and Cambridge and graduated with a Master of Arts degree. She took time out from her career for a family, and then studied piano at Royal Northern College. A Welsh Arts Council Bursary allowed her to study with Elizabeth Lutyens, Anthony Payne and Franco Donatoni.
 
After ending her musical studies, Luff lived and worked for many years in London and Birmingham, where she taught at the University School of Continuing Studies. She founded a music publishing firm with composer Julia Usher called Primavera. Luff now resides and composes in Cardiff.

Works
Luff has composed a large number of works for solo instruments, chamber ensembles, and voice.  Selected works include:

1986: Piano Sonata: "Storm Tide"
1989: Sleep, Sleep, February (Fl,Ob,Cl,Pno) a meditative piece
1992: Listening for the Roar of the Sun. (Solo oboe, Dancer, speaker, Slides)
1997: The Glass Wall (three dancers, solo Cello, and electronic tape)
1997: Studies for the Glass Wall (for solo cello)
1999: Telyneg (Lyric for Oboe and harp)

Discography
 Ariel Composers of Wales, Catherine Handley, flute, and Andrew Wilson-Dickson, piano. Cyfansoddwyr Cymru (2009)
The Music of Enid Luff Contemporary chamber music. Ty Cerdd.

References

1935 births
20th-century classical composers
21st-century classical composers
Women classical composers
Living people
Welsh classical composers
20th-century British composers
20th-century women composers
21st-century women composers